The 2020 United States presidential election in South Dakota was held on Tuesday, November 3, 2020, as part of the 2020 United States presidential election in which all 50 states plus the District of Columbia participated. South Dakota voters chose electors to represent them in the Electoral College via a popular vote, pitting the Republican Party's nominee, incumbent President Donald Trump, and running mate Vice President Mike Pence against Democratic Party nominee, former Vice President Joe Biden, and his running mate California Senator Kamala Harris. South Dakota has three electoral votes in the Electoral College.

Trump carried South Dakota by 61.8%–35.6%, or a margin of 26.2%. Biden performed four points better than Hillary Clinton in 2016. Prior to the election, all 12 news organizations considered this a state Trump would win, or a safe red state. This was Libertarian Jo Jorgensen’s best state, with 2.63% of the vote.

Primary elections
The primary elections were held on June 2, 2020.

Republican primary
Donald Trump ran unopposed in the Republican primary, and thus received all of the state's 29 delegates to the 2020 Republican National Convention.

Democratic primary

Libertarian nominee
Prior to the South Dakota primaries, the 2020 Libertarian National Convention was held on May 22–24, 2020, selecting Jo Jorgensen, Psychology Senior Lecturer at Clemson University, as their presidential nominee.

General election

Final predictions

Polling

Graphical summary

Aggregate polls

Polls

Electoral slates
These slates of electors were nominated by each party in order to vote in the Electoral College should their candidate win the state:

Results

Results by county

Counties that flipped from Republican to Democratic
 Ziebach (largest municipality: Dupree)

By congressional district
South Dakota has only one congressional district because of its small population compared to other states. This district, called the At-Large district because it covers the entire state, is equivalent to the statewide election results.

Analysis
South Dakota, a majority-White, mainly-rural state in the Midwestern Plains, is normally a Republican stronghold at both the state and presidential levels, despite being more populated than—and voting to the left of—neighboring North Dakota. It hasn't voted for a Democratic presidential candidate since Lyndon B. Johnson carried it in 1964, against the backdrop of his nationwide landslide victory. It has only been competitive (within 5 points of a Democratic victory) in three elections since then: 1976, 1992, and 1996, all elections the Democratic nominee won. Even South Dakota Senator George McGovern failed to carry his home state as Democratic nominee in the Republican landslide of 1972.

Despite Trump's win in the state, Biden flipped majority-Native American Ziebach County back to Democratic after it flipped red in 2016. Meanwhile, Trump held the majority-Native American counties of Bennett, Mellette and Jackson, and grew his support in Corson County, particularly in white-majority precincts while Biden held on to Native American support in other majority-minority precincts in the state. Per exit polls by the Associated Press, Trump won 63% of White Americans, a group composing 94% of the electorate. A sparsely populated state with a rural and conservative lifestyle, South Dakota has an agrarian populist streak to which Trump made direct appeals. He campaigned personally in the state, using Mount Rushmore as a backdrop to cast himself as waging battle against a "new far-left fascism".

While Biden did not win Minnehaha County, home to the state's largest city, Sioux Falls, that Barack Obama carried by less than one percent in 2008, he reduced Trump's 2016 14.6-percent winning margin in the county to 9.4 points, although Trump received a higher percentage of votes in the county than Mitt Romney did in 2012.

See also
 Presidency of Joe Biden
 United States presidential elections in South Dakota
 2020 United States presidential election
 2020 Democratic Party presidential primaries
 2020 Libertarian Party presidential primaries
 2020 Republican Party presidential primaries
 2020 United States elections

Notes

References

External links
 
 
  (State affiliate of the U.S. League of Women Voters)
 

South Dakota
2020
Presidential